is a Japanese multinational automaker based in Fuchū, Hiroshima, Japan.

Gearsets
The Mazda G5M five speed manual transaxle came in several gearsets:

See also
List of Mazda transmissions

References

G5M